Stand to Reason is a UK-based mental health charity which aims to raise the profile of people who are mentally ill, fight prejudice, establish rights and achieve equality.

It is run by former corporate financier Jonathan Naess.

Activities 
Stand to Reason volunteers speak at conferences and awareness events and respond to media enquiries about mental health in the workplace.

Stand to Reason has a panel of volunteers from many walks of life who are happy to talk about their own mental health experiences and recovery to be stronger than before and to create a greater impact on the world.

Stand to Reason also helps to reduce stigma surrounding mental health by providing a variety of services to organisations including:
 training line managers and HR teams in understanding, spotting and handling mental health in their teams
 establishing peer support networks both within and across employers
 offering public peer support workshops to help people stay at (or get back to) work following a mental health problem.

See also
Centre for Mental Health
Improving Access to Psychological Therapies
Mental Health Foundation
Mental Health Providers' Forum
Mind
Rethink Mental Illness
Richmond Fellowship
Revolving Doors Agency
SANE
Together
Turning Point

General:
 Mental health in the United Kingdom

References

External links
 Standtoreason.org

Health charities in the United Kingdom
Mental health organisations in the United Kingdom
Charities based in London